Henri Dagba (born 1957) is a Beninese athlete. He competed in the men's triple jump at the 1980 Summer Olympics.

References

1957 births
Living people
Athletes (track and field) at the 1980 Summer Olympics
Beninese male triple jumpers
Olympic athletes of Benin
Place of birth missing (living people)